Pinery is a locality in South Australia's lower Mid North. At the 2006 census, Pinery had a population of 279 but the locality was included with the town of Owen in the 2011 census (population 634) and residents were not counted separately. Both of those were a much larger area than the area which had 102 residents in 2016.

See also
 List of cities and towns in South Australia
 2015 Pinery bushfire

References

External links
 Wakefield Regional Council

Towns in South Australia